Audrey Doris Jones  (15 September 192326 September 2006) was an English material scientist and a senior lecturer in the department of applied acoustics at the University of Salford. She made important contributions to the theory of the Johnsen–Rahbek effect, the electrical and thermal conductivity of semiconductors, and the thermal resistance of building insulation. She was the only daughter of Frederick Stuckes, the general manager of a shipbroking firm, and was educated at Colston's Girls' School in Bristol. In 1942, she won a scholarship to study the Natural Sciences Tripos at Newnham College in the University of Cambridge.

Stuckes graduated in 1946 with a BA degree and joined Metropolitan-Vickers, Trafford, as a graduate trainee in the research department. From 1953, she published a series of papers on the thermal and electrical conductivity of semiconductors. She proved the existence of the JohnsenRahbek effect and proposed an electric circuit model to explain the data. In December 1962, she was elected a Fellow of the Institute of Physics, and in the following year, she left MetropolitanVickers to work as a lecturer in the department of pure and applied physics at the Royal College of Advanced Technology, Salford, that became the University of Salford in 1967.

In 1975, Stuckes, together with John Edwin Parrott, published a wellreceived textbook that reviewed the theory and experimental data on thermal conductivity in solids and semiconductors. By 1979, she was a senior lecturer in the department of applied acoustics at Salford, and in the following year, she was in charge of the department's heat laboratory. The laboratory was supported by grants from, amongst others, the Science and Engineering Research Council and the Building Research Establishment. These grants funded studies to investigate the efficiency of insulating materials. She led a team to obtain experimental data that would allow builders to calculate a standard level of insulation. In 1982, she presented a television programme for the Open University that demonstrated the usefulness of these simple models of thermal conduction. She retired from the university in September 1988 and died after a long illness at a nursing home in Urmston, Trafford.

Early life 
Stuckes was born on 15September 1923 at Bristol, England, the only daughter of Frederick Stephen Stuckes and Beatrice May, . They had married on 8January 1916 at StJohn the Baptist, Bedminster, Bristol. Her father worked for Bethell, Gwyn, and Company (Bethell Gwyn), at 11Baldwin Street, Bristol, a shipbroking firm dealing mainly with Australasian trade. During World War I, he volunteered as a sergeant in the 1/4th Battalion of the City of Bristol Rifles, and on 27June 1917, he was commissioned a second lieutenant in the Royal Warwickshire Regiment. He relinquished his commission on 22June 1918 after he became ill while on active service.

After the war, Stuckes' father returned to Bethell Gwyn, and in March 1953, he was elected president of the Bristol Steamship Owners' Association. He had been elected a fellow of the Institute of Chartered Shipbrokers in 1945, and in August 1953, he was elected chair of the Bristol section of the institute. In the 1950s, he was secretary to the Apsley Players, a musical quintet based in Bristol. In September 1956, he retired from Bethell Gwyn after fortyeight years of service.

Stuckes' elder brother, Jack Stephen, was educated at Merrywood Grammar School, Knowle, Bristol, and studied electrical engineering at the Merchant Venturers' Technical College, Bristol. During World War II, he was a corporal in No. 34 Service Flying Training School of the Royal Air Force, based at the Royal Canadian Air Force station Medicine Hat in Alberta, Canada. At the end of the war, he took a position as a cashier and wages clerk for Christy Brothers, an engineering company based at Bower Ashton in south west Bristol, that was contracted to the North Somerset Electricity Supply Company.

Education 

Stuckes was first educated at Merrywood primary school in Knowle, Bristol. In June 1934, she gained a foundational boarding scholarship to Red Maids' School, Westbury-on-Trym. She went on to study at Colston's Girls' School, Montpelier, Bristol, where, in July 1942, she passed her Higher School Certificate in natural sciences with a distinction in chemistry. She was offered a Pfeiffer scholarship at Bedford College, University of London, and awarded a Gamble scholarship by the school of £50 a year, that was tenable at the universities of Oxford, Cambridge, London, and at the Royal Free Hospital for Women.

However, instead of taking up the scholarship at Bedford, Stuckes entered Newnham College in the University of Cambridge, to study the Natural Sciences Tripos. In 1946, she graduated with a BA degree, and in the same year, she was elected a student member of the Physical Society of London. In 1950, she was elected an associate of the Institute of Physics and awarded an MA by Cambridge. In 1969, she returned to Cambridge to complete a PhD, and subsequently, she was elected to the senate of the university.

Career 

After leaving Cambridge, Stuckes joined Metropolitan-Vickers, Trafford, Greater Manchester, as a graduate trainee in the research department. MetropolitanVickers was a British heavy industrial firm, known for manufacturing electrical equipment and generators, street lighting, and electronics. The company had a relatively favourable attitude to placing graduate women in professional electrical engineering positions. For example, when Stuckes joined the company, Beryl Dent led the computation section and supervised the laboratory team that investigated the physical properties of semiconductors. Stuckes collaborated with Dent on Stuckes' first published paper on the heating effects that occur when a current is passed through a semiconductor. Dent suggested methods to solve the equations and computed the numerical integrations.

From 1953, Stuckes published a series of papers on the thermal and electrical conductivity of semiconductors. In one such paper, she investigated the electrostatic force between polished plates of a semiconductor and a metal when placed in contact and a voltage applied. The force is caused by the free charge that accumulates between the semiconductor and metal surfaces. This force, or attraction, is known as the Johnsen–Rahbek effect, and is proportional to the square of the applied voltage. Stuckes constructed a clutch that consisted of a plate of magnesium orthotitanate, a hard, ceramic semiconductor, that rubbed against a highlypolished steel plate. She proved the existence of the effect and proposed an electric circuit model to explain the data. She also found that abrasion at the contact surfaces caused the force to decrease as the number of operations increased.

On 4December 1962, Stuckes was elected a Fellow of the Institute of Physics, and in the following year, she left MetropolitanVickers to work as a lecturer in the department of pure and applied physics at the Royal College of Advanced Technology, Salford, that became the University of Salford in 1967. In 1975, Stuckes, together with John Edwin Parrott, published a textbook that reviewed the theory and experimental data on thermal conductivity in solids and semiconductors. Parrott was a scientist at the Aldermaston Court research laboratory of Associated Electrical Industries (the then holding company of MetropolitanVickers), and later, professor of physics at University of Wales, Cardiff. In 1956, he had obtained a PhD from the University of Reading on the thermal and thermoelectric properties of semiconductors. Paul Gustav Klemens, late professor of physics at the University of Connecticut, reviewed the book at the time of publication and stated that "[it] is most unique and valuable; the theoretical problem is very difficult, and nowhere is there such a good summary of the useful approximations and the salient results."

By 1979, Stuckes was a senior lecturer in the department of applied acoustics at Salford, and in the following year, she was in charge of the department's heat laboratory. The laboratory was supported by grants from the Polymer Engineering Directorate and the Building Subcommittee (she was a member of this committee in 1982) of the Science and Engineering Research Council, and the Building Research Establishment in the Department of the Environment. These grants funded a study to investigate how moisture in cavity walls affects the surrounding insulation. At the time, no one knew the exact efficiency of standard polymeric insulating materials as data was based on material in "dry" condition. Stuckes led a team to obtain experimental data that would allow builders to calculate a standard level of insulation. The study concluded that heat transfer in buildings can be modelled adequately by simple, onedimensional, steady state models.

In 1982, Stuckes presented a television programme for the Open University that demonstrated the usefulness of these simple models of thermal conduction. The programme was first broadcast on BBC One in the morning of 3May 1982 and formed part of the Open University's unit on heat transfer. In the 1980s, she continued to publish research on the thermal properties of building materials.  In one study with Anthony Simpson, they found that the shape of air inclusions within vermiculite concrete affected the thermal conductivity of the concrete. This finding was explored further with British Petroleum and resulted in a joint patent being granted on a thermally insulating filler. By May 1986, she was awarded Chartered Physicist status by the Institute of Physics, and by September 1988, she had retired from her position at the university.

Personal life and death 
In retirement, Stuckes resided at 58 Carlton Road in Hale, Trafford. In October 1947, she had become engaged to Douglas Perrin Jones, the eldest son of William Henry Perrin Jones of Port Sunlight, Wirral. At the time of their engagement, Douglas was an electrical engineer in the research department at MetropolitanVickers. When they both worked there, he would assist in her research, including in 1953, an investigation into the heating effects that occur when a current is passed through a semiconductor. After their marriage at Bristol in 1949, she continued to use her maiden name in her academic life and scientific publications.

Douglas died on 15July 1995 and the funeral service was held at Altrincham Crematorium, Dunham Massey, on 21July 1995. Her funeral service was held at the same crematorium on 3October 2006 and her ashes were later interred in the crematorium grounds.

Academic conferences 
The following table contains academic conferences where Stuckes was known to have organised the conference and/or read a paper.

Selected publications

Books

Patents

Academic papers

Electrical and thermal conductivity of semiconductors

Thermal conductivity of building materials

See also

Footnotes

References

Bibliography

Further reading

External links 
 Onedimensional steady state heat transfer via the Wayback Machine. The link opens a video of the Open University television programme presented by Stuckes that was first broadcast on BBC One at 7:05am on 3May 1982. It constitutes programme twelve of thirtytwo for the mathematical models and methods module (Open University module code MST204, unit 12).
 Image of the thermal wall laboratory, taken in 1976, at the department of applied acoustics, University of Salford.
 The Thermal Measurement Laboratory at the University of Salford.

1923 births
2006 deaths
20th-century British physicists
20th-century British women scientists
20th-century English educators
20th-century English women
20th-century English people
20th-century women educators
Academics of the University of Salford
Alumni of Newnham College, Cambridge
British women academics
English physicists
English women educators
English women physicists
Fellows of the Institute of Physics
Metropolitan-Vickers people
People associated with the Open University
People educated at Montpelier High School, Bristol
People educated at The Red Maids' School
People from Salford
Scientists from Bristol
Thermodynamicists